Michael Passons is an American singer-songwriter and the founding member of the Christian band Avalon.

Biography
Michael Passons was born and raised in Yazoo City, Mississippi, and as a toddler, began to sing and play piano.  As a young musician, Passons was influenced by music from the small country church where his family attended, and also popular mainstream singer/piano player artists like Elton John and Lionel Richie. 
Michael went on to attend Mississippi College where he graduated with a degree in classical piano.  He joined a college band his senior year, and after graduating, toured nationally several summers with a New Jersey-based band.

Passons moved to Nashville in 1990 and began working with fellow musicians.  It was there that Grant Cunningham, a Sparrow Records (EMI) A&R director, caught his performance at a February 1995 Nashville showcase. This pivotal meeting led to Passons becoming the founding member of the Christian pop group, Avalon. The band made its debut in November 1995, in San Jose, California, at the start of the multi-city arena tour, "The Young Messiah," alongside such artists as Steven Curtis Chapman, CeCe Winans and Michael W. Smith.

This proved to be an excellent launching pad for Avalon who, during Passons' tenure, later garnered two gold records, twenty #1 radio singles, six GMA awards, two GRAMMY nominations, a 2003 American Music Award for, "Favorite Artist Contemporary Inspiration," and their hit song, "Testify to Love," would eventually be named one of the top gospel songs of all time.

After eight years with Avalon, Passons left the group in 2003. After years of public statements by Avalon to the contrary, Passons confirmed in a 2020 podcast interview that he was forced out of the group because he was gay and that he ultimately refused to attend reparative therapy.
"Avalon showed up at my house and told me I was no longer in the group ... And it was all because of who I am."

Since leaving Avalon, Michael has been an opening act on tour with fellow Christian group, Point of Grace.  He has also collaborated with Country Music singer Ty Herndon and Broadway star Kristin Chenoweth to record a new inclusive version of Avalon's 2006 song "Orphans of God".

References

External links
Entertainmentwatch.net - An Interview with Michael Passons
Michael Passons: Movin' Out
Avalon - Christian Music.com

1965 births
Living people
American Christians
American gospel musicians
American male pianists
American gay musicians
LGBT people from Mississippi
People from Yazoo City, Mississippi
Singer-songwriters from Mississippi
20th-century American LGBT people
21st-century American LGBT people
American male singer-songwriters